Trenčianske Teplice is a health resort and small spa town in western Slovakia, in the valley of the river Teplička, at the foothills of the Strážovské vrchy mountains, a few kilometres away from the city of Trenčín.

Characteristics
The town of Trenčianske Teplice is known not only for its thermal springs and the health resorts, but also for an international film festival Art film and the Bridge of Fame. Not far from the town is also a small village Motešice, known very well for horse-breeding farm and horse racing. 'Green Frog' is a name for sport/recreational complex, very popular by locals, which was renovated and reopened in 2015.

Legend
A legend says that the healing springs were discovered by a gammy shepherd while he was looking for a lost sheep. He found a small hot water pool with a sulphuric smell and after several days, he recovered.

History
In the middle of the 13th century as terra Teplicza it was property of the Cseszneky de Milvány family. It has been a spa site since the 14th century. As early as the 16th century, the spa was known all over Europe, and was mentioned as the most important of the Kingdom of Hungary. The spa was owned by the Illésházy, an aristocratic family of the Kingdom of Hungary, from 1582 onwards. In 1835, it was bought by the Viennese financier Jozef Sina, who developed the area. The spa was nationalised after the Second World War.

Bridge of Fame
What does make bridges famous? Might be architects, builders, location, size or shape. The Bridge of Fame in Trenčianske Teplice is different. The bridge is located in small town, overarching a small river, but known by whole country. Bridge of Fame is the place where a plate dedicated to the top guest of the biggest film festival in Slovakia is added. The festival was held in Trenčianske Teplice since 1993 (until 2015), Artfilm. The plates given here to date include those dedicated to Sophia Loren, Gina Lollobrigida, Franco Nero, Ornella Muti, as well as exceptional Slovak film actors and actress as: Jozef Kroner or Emília Vášáryová.

Artfilm
Film festival Art Film Fest was held for first time 1993, the year when "Slovak republic" was founded. Artfilm is the longest active international film related festival in Slovakia. The festival was founded by "Peter Hledik", who is also the director. As Mr. Hledik said, the reason for founding the festival was affected by the time, early 90s. The time when film studios in Slovakia had significant financial problems and they stopped filming. Artfilm wanted to replace live cinematography. The first years of the festival begins 14 June 1993 in Trenčianske Teplice with "UNESCO" support. It was a small review of documentary movies in one cinema hall for just 200 people.
By the time, festival has been growing and has become one of the most iconic cultural events in Slovakia. While in 1993 the festival welcomed just 300 visitors, in 2009 it was 25 000 visitors. 
Because of the growing tendency, in 2016, the event was moved from small town of Trenčianske Teplice to the second biggest city in Slovakia Košice.

Carpathian Jewel
Long before the era of the successful film festival was kicked off, Trenčianske Teplice, became famous as a spa resort. The town is nested amid lovely nature in the Teplicka Valley, and thanks to the exceptional location and the healing springs it was given a Romanic attribute - 'Carpatian Jewel'. When lords of Trenčin Castle learned about this natural jewel in the past, they discovered that it's worth not only being protected, but also aggrandised. Palatine Štefan Zápoľský in the 16th century laid the foundation stone of what later became the spa resort area. The spa is open year round, and is visited by people looking for a cure for diseases of locomotive organs and nervous system. The resort lies in an ideal natural environment, protected against wind and enjoying many sunny days. Traditional curative methods have been marvellously joined by the modern methods of comprehensive balneotherapy. This features the use of curative effects of thermal mineral springs along with wonderful healing effects of mineralised mud. Thermal water rises from the depth of around 1200 meters, and before it comes out on the surface, it flows through limy soil and layers of magnesium, which results in its intense mineralization and warming.
Besides enjoying the beneficial effects of the healing springs, visitors to the spa have a chance to admire an interesting architecture of the own of Trenčianske Teplice. The most popular is a bath called hammam, which can be taken in a spa house called Sina]. The house is decorated in an Oriental (arabic/moorish) style of late 19th century. The surroundings of the spa houses are glamorised by a Romantic English park with a small pond.

A hydroelectric power station (it was producing polyphase AC of 5250 V) was built between 1886–1888 and supplied the town's streetlights as well as surrounding communities (Trenčianska Teplá, Košeca, Ladce) with electricity. It also powered a special narrow-gauged public electric railway opened on 29 July 1909. It still operates today.

Sport
Slovak Bandy Association has its seat in Trenčianske Teplice.

Demographics
According to the 2001 census, the town had 4,438 inhabitants. 96.6% of inhabitants were Slovaks, 1.7% Czechs and 0.2% Hungarians. The religious makeup was 77.7% Roman Catholics, 13.6% people with no religious affiliation, and 4.6% Lutherans.

Twin towns – sister cities

Trenčianske Teplice is twinned with:
 Aschersleben, Germany 
 Tuzla, Turkey
 Vsetín, Czech Republic
 Wilamowice, Poland

References

External links
 Official website
 Trenčianske Teplice Spa

Cities and towns in Slovakia
Spa towns in Slovakia